Syzygium calcadensis is a species of plant in the family Myrtaceae. It is endemic to Tamil Nadu in India.

References

calcadense
Flora of Tamil Nadu
Vulnerable plants
Taxonomy articles created by Polbot
Taxobox binomials not recognized by IUCN